Pedro Mariño de Lobera (1528–1594) was a Galician soldier, conquistador and chronicler of the Arauco War in the Captaincy General of Chile.

Biography
A professional soldier who served in the war between Spain and France, he went to the Americas in 1545.  Mariño joined the forces of Pedro de La Gasca in Havana, Cuba, when he received the order of King Carlos V to end the revolt of Gonzalo Pizarro in Peru. He was then transferred to Lima where he remained until his trip to Chile, in 1551.

In Chile he participated actively next to Pedro de Valdivia and Francisco de Villagra in the first campaigns made to the South, as an outstanding soldier. Also, he was present in the campaigns of the governors García Hurtado de Mendoza and Rodrigo de Quiroga.

Later, in payment of his services, an encomienda in the city of Valdivia was granted to him. He was the corregidor of the city, rendering his aid to the victims of the flood caused by the 1575 Valdivia earthquake. Later he was also corregidor of Camaná, in the south coast of Peru, returning later to Lima.

In his last years Mariño de Lobera developed a friendship with the Jesuit Fr. Bartolomé de Escobar, who also had been in Chile, giving him the manuscripts of his Chronicle of the Kingdom of Chile to be corrected and published by the priest. Even though Fr. Escobar edited the manuscript, the text was never printed at the time. Only in 1865 was it published in the Volume VI of the Colección de Historiadores de Chile y documentos relativos a la Historia Nacional de ese país. Mariño de Lobera died in Lima in 1594.

Additional information

See also

History of Chile
Pedro de Valdivia
García Hurtado de Mendoza
Francisco de Villagra
Alonso de Góngora Marmolejo
Jerónimo de Vivar
Alonso de Ercilla
Arauco War
Mapuche people

Bibliography

Notes

Sources

1528 births
1594 deaths
16th-century Spanish historians
Chilean historians
Chilean people of Galician descent
People of the Arauco War
Spanish conquistadors
Explorers of Chile
16th-century explorers
People from Valdivia
Spanish chroniclers
Galician conquistadors